James Wedderburn (born 23 June 1938) was a Barbadian athlete who competed mainly in the 400 metres.

He competed for the British West Indies in the 1960 Summer Olympics held in Rome, Italy in the 4 x 400 metre relay where he won the bronze medal with his team mates from Jamaica Malcolm Spence, Keith Gardner and George Kerr.

References

Profile at sports-reference.com

Barbadian male sprinters
Olympic bronze medalists for the British West Indies
Athletes (track and field) at the 1960 Summer Olympics
Olympic athletes of the British West Indies
1938 births
Living people
People educated at The Lodge School, Barbados
Medalists at the 1960 Summer Olympics
Olympic bronze medalists in athletics (track and field)